Alfred E. Mann (1925 – February 25, 2016), also known as Al Mann, was an American physicist, inventor, entrepreneur, and philanthropist.

Early life and education
Mann was born and raised to a Jewish family in Portland, Oregon. His father was a grocer who emigrated from England; his mother a pianist and singer who immigrated from Poland.

Business
In 1956, Mann founded Spectrolab, the first of his aerospace companies.  While at Spectrolab, an electro optical systems company, he also founded Heliotek, a semiconductor company, that became a major supplier of solar cells for spacecraft.  Among other accomplishments during his tenure, Mann's companies provided the electric power for over 100 spacecraft and constructed one of the lunar experiments.  Although he sold both companies to Textron in 1960 (merged into one, Spectrolab is now a subsidiary of Boeing Satellite Systems), he continued to manage them until 1972.  After he left those companies to found Pacesetter Systems, which focused on cardiac pacemakers, he sold that company in 1985 and managed it until 1992.  It is now a part of St. Jude Medical.  Mann then went on to establish MiniMed (insulin pumps and continuous glucose devices, now owned by Medtronic) and Advanced Bionics (neuroprosthetics, now focused on cochlear implants and owned by Sonova, while its pain management and other neural stimulation products are now owned by Boston Scientific).

At the time of his death, Mann was involved in several companies, including:
founder and chairman of Second Sight Medical Products, a biomedical company which produces the Argus retinal prosthesis;
founder and chairman of Bioness, a company devoted to applying electrostimulation for functional neural defects such as paralysis;
founder and chairman of the Board of Quallion, LLC, a company producing high reliability batteries for medical products and for the military and aerospace industries;
Chairman of Stellar Microelectronics, an electronic circuit manufacturer for the medical, military and aerospace industries;
 Mann also chaired the Southern California Biomedical Council (SCBC or SoCalBio), the trade association that has represented and promoted the growth of biotech, medtech and digital health industries in the Greater Los Angeles region.

In June 2014, the US Food and Drug Administration approved MannKind Corporation's application for a unique inhalable insulin (Afrezza) for the treatment of diabetes.  Mannkind subsequently licensed the device to a French pharmaceutical company, Sanofi, for US$925 million.  Mann was chairman of the board of MannKind Corporation, a biomedical company, where he also served as chief executive officer until January 12, 2015. In November 2015, Hakan Edstrom stepped down as CEO and president and will remain until July, 2017 to provide other services for the company.  Mann again stepped in as interim CEO.

Mann also served on the board of directors and was the largest investor in Eclipse Aviation

Mann was one of the main investors in the development of Mulholland Estates, a gated community in Los Angeles.

Philanthropy
Mann established Alfred E. Mann Institutes for Biomedical Engineering at the University of Southern California (USC), known as AMI/USC ($162 million); at Purdue University known as AMI/Purdue ($100 million); and at the Technion known as AMIT ($104 million) are business incubators for medical device development in preparation for commercialization. The Institutes are essentially fully funded.  Three other universities were in late stage discussions as of 2006.  AMI was founded in 1998 when Alfred Mann made his first $100 million gift to USC, a major private research university in Los Angeles.  The total gifted endowment for AMI/USC is $162 million since then.

The Alfred Mann Foundation for Biomedical Engineering is charged with selecting, establishing and overseeing the institutes, similar to AMI at USC and at other research universities.

Mann was a Life Trustee of the University of Southern California.

Founded in 1985, the Alfred Mann Foundation has several core aims.  It aims to work with scientists and research organizations to find bionic solutions for people suffering from debilitating medical impairments.

As an alumnus of UCLA, he tried to make a substantial monetary gift to his alma mater to fund a bioengineering institute. However, the donation failed over Mann's desire to retain control over patents and patent revenues generated by the institute. The $162 million gift eventually went to USC, a private institution that agreed to his terms.

On March 16, 2007, Purdue University received a $100 million endowment from the Mann Foundation for Biomedical Engineering. The endowment was the largest research gift ever at the university and created the Alfred Mann Institute at Purdue. However, AMI Purdue was closed and the unspent portion of the $100 million endowment from the MANN Foundation was rescinded in early 2012.

Personal life
Mann has been married four times and has seven children. His first wife was Beverly Mann. They divorced in 1957 and had three sons together: Brian Mann, Howard Mann and Richard Mann. His second wife was Linda Mann. They divorced in 1973 after 6 years of marriage and had three children together: Carla Mann Woods, Alfred Mann Jr. and Kevin Mann. His third wife was Susan Kendall; they divorced in 1997. In 2004, he married his fourth wife, Claude Mann. He adopted her daughter, Cassandra, from a previous marriage. His wife, Claude, was born in a concentration camp during World War II. Her father, a diplomat - who was active in the French Resistance - had been imprisoned for hiding Jews from Nazi soldiers. Her mother who spoke several languages and was a translator for the German Government fell in love with Claude's father and helped him escape with their baby back to France.

Alfred E. Mann Foundation for Biomedical Engineering: "Alfred Mann Institute For Biomedical Development at the Technion - Israel Institute of Technology (AMIT) Opens Doors of the $100 Million Institute" July 18, 2007 | The motivation behind opening an institute within Israel came from Mann's wife, Claude Mann. Claude, who is not Jewish,  will always hold a strong connection with the Jewish people.

Mann died on February 25, 2016, of natural causes in Las Vegas, Nevada at the age of 90.

Son Brian was an employee at Pacesetter Systems and daughter Carla was an employee at Advanced Bionics.

Recognition
2000, Golden Plate Award of the American Academy of Achievement
2003, Business Journal's Los Angeles Business Person of the Year
2011, MDEA Lifetime Achievement Award

References

External links
 Alfred E. Mann Foundation

1925 births
2016 deaths
American billionaires
Jewish American philanthropists
American manufacturing businesspeople
Philanthropists from Oregon
Giving Pledgers
21st-century philanthropists
Members of the United States National Academy of Engineering
American people of English-Jewish descent
American people of Polish-Jewish descent
American company founders
20th-century American businesspeople
21st-century American businesspeople
University of California, Los Angeles alumni
Businesspeople from Portland, Oregon
20th-century American philanthropists
21st-century American Jews
Inventors from Oregon